Kettletown State Park is a public recreation area on the eastern shore of the Housatonic River's Lake Zoar in the towns of Oxford and Southbury, Connecticut. Park activities include camping, hiking, picnicking, and fishing. The state park is managed by the Connecticut Department of Energy and Environmental Protection.

References

External links

Kettletown State Park Connecticut Department of Energy and Environmental Protection
Kettletown State Park Map Connecticut Department of Energy and Environmental Protection

State parks of Connecticut
Parks in New Haven County, Connecticut
Southbury, Connecticut
Protected areas established in 1950
1950 establishments in Connecticut